The desert iguana (Dipsosaurus dorsalis) is an  iguana species found in the Sonoran and Mojave Deserts of the Southwestern United States and northwestern Mexico, as well as on several Gulf of California islands.

Taxonomy

The species was first described in the Catalog of North American Reptiles, by Spencer Fullerton Baird and Charles Frédéric Girard, in 1859 as Crotaphytus dorsalis. It was reclassified two years later as Dipsosaurus  dofus dorsalis by Edward Hallowell.  The generic name comes from a combination of two Greek words meaning "thirsty lizard": "" for "thirsty", and "" for "lizard".  The specific name, "dorsalis", comes from the Latin word dorsum meaning "spike", in reference to a row of enlarged spiked scales on the middle of the lizard's back which form a crest that extends almost to the tip of its vent. Dipsosaurus contains two species, D. dorsalis, and D. catalinensis. Genetic evidence supports Dipsosaurus being the most basal extant member of Iguanidae, diverging during the late Eocene, about 38 million years ago.

There are two peninsular and one continental subspecies of the desert iguana.

Description

The desert iguana is a medium-sized lizard which averages  in total length but can grow to a maximum of  including the tail. They are pale gray-tan to cream in color with a light brown reticulated pattern on their backs and sides. Down the center of the back is a row of slightly-enlarged, keeled dorsal scales that become slightly larger farther down the back. The reticulated pattern gives way to brown spots near the back legs, turning into stripes along the tail. The tail is usually around 1½ times longer than the body from snout to vent. The belly is pale. During the breeding season, the sides become pinkish in both sexes.

Habitat

Their preferred habitat is largely contained within the range of the creosote bush, mainly dry, sandy desert scrubland below . They have a significant presence in the Sonoran and Mojave deserts. They can also be found in rocky streambeds up to 1,000 m. In the southern portion of its range, these lizards lives in areas of arid subtropical scrub and tropical deciduous forest.

These lizards can withstand high temperatures and are out and about after other lizards have retreated into their burrows. They seek shade when their body temperature is in the low-forties (celsius), and seek the protection of a burrow when their body temperature reaches the mid-forties (Celsius). They burrow extensively and if threatened will scamper into a shrub and go quickly down a burrow. Their burrows are usually dug in the sand under bushes like the creosote. They also often use burrows of kit foxes and desert tortoises.

Reproduction also plays a role in where these lizards are found. It is believed that the high temperature environment helps with successful hatching of eggs. The eggs often hatch between temperatures of 28 and 38 degrees Celsius.

Diet and reproduction
Mating takes place in the early spring, often around May-June. It is believed that only one clutch of eggs is laid each year, with each clutch having 3-8 eggs. The hatchlings emerge around September.

Desert iguanas are primarily herbivorous, eating buds, fruits and leaves of many annual and perennial plants.  They are especially attracted to the yellow flowers of the creosote bush.  They will eat the foliage of the creosote bush as well. Even though lots of desert iguanas are herbivores there are some subspecies of Desert iguana who have a 54% plant based diet and 44% animal based diet. The most common specie Desert iguanas eat are ants. Predators of these iguanas and their eggs are birds of prey, foxes, rats, long-tailed weasels, some snakes, and humans.

References 

 Frost, D.R. and R.E. Etheridge (1989) A Phylogenetic Analysis and Taxonomy of Iguanian Lizards (Reptilia: Squamata). Univ. Kansas Mus. Nat. Hist. Misc. Publ. 81
 Frost, D.R.,  R. Etheridge, D. Janies and T.A. Titus (2001) Total evidence, sequence alignment, evolution of Polychrotid lizards, and a reclassification of the Iguania (Squamata: Iguania). American Museum Novitates 3343: 38 pp.
Hancock, T. V., & Gleeson, T. T. (2007). Contributions to Elevated Metabolism during Recovery: Dissecting the Excess Postexercise Oxygen Consumption (EPOC) in the Desert Iguana (Dipsosaurus dorsalis). Physiological and Biochemical Zoology, 81(1), 1–13. 
Revell, T. K., & Dunbar, S. G. (2007). The energetic savings of sleep versus temperature in the Desert Iguana ( Dipsosaurus dorsalis) at three ecologically relevant temperatures. Comparative Biochemistry and Physiology. Part A, Molecular & Integrative Physiology, 148(2), 393–398.
Valdivia-Carrillo, T., García-De León, F. J., Blázquez, M. C., Gutiérrez-Flores, C., & González Zamorano, P. (2017). Phylogeography and Ecological Niche Modeling of the Desert Iguana (Dipsosaurus dorsalis, Baird & Girard 1852) in the Baja California Peninsula. The Journal of Heredity, 108(6), 640–649.

External links

 Desert Iguana Pictures 
 Arizona-Sonora Desert Museum: Desert Iguana (Dipsosaurus dorsalis)
 San Diego Natural History Museum: Dipsosaurus dorsalis (Desert Iguana)

Dipsosaurus
Reptiles of Mexico
Reptiles of the United States
Fauna of the Sonoran Desert
Fauna of the Mojave Desert
Fauna of the Southwestern United States
Fauna of Gulf of California islands
Lizards of North America
Reptiles described in 1852
Least concern biota of North America
Least concern biota of the United States
Taxa named by Spencer Fullerton Baird
Taxa named by Charles Frédéric Girard